Bali Safari and Marine Park, or Taman Safari Indonesia III  is a branch of Taman Safari located in Gianyar, Bali. Bali Safari and Marine Park is managed by the Taman Safari Group which also manages Taman Safari Indonesia 1 in Cisarua, Bogor, West Java and Taman Safari Indonesia 2 in Prigen, East Java. Like the two previous Safari Parks, BSMP is also a conservation organization and a member of the Association of Indonesian Zoos.

The animals in BSMP are types of animals from three regions (Indonesia, India and Africa), including white starlings, owls, sun bears, Sumatran tigers, spotted deer, Himalayan bears, nilgai, black bucks, hippos, greaves zebra, one-humped camel, ostrich, baboon, blue wildebeest and lion.

Geographical Location
Bali Safari and Marine Park with an area of ± 40 ha, is located in an area that includes the area of three villages, namely Medahan Village, Lebih Village, and Serongga Village, which are in Gianyar Regency, Bali.[3] This location is around 17 km from Denpasar or about 30 km from Kuta.

Tourism Park Concept
Bali Safari & Marine Park provides a unique medium, a combination of wildlife in their natural habitat with ecosystems intersecting with Balinese culture. BSMP is a breeding place for endemic or endangered animals in Indonesia and several neighboring countries. The basic concept of BSMP is to invite visitors to enjoy a safari experience that starts from modern Bali, enters ancient Balinese life, with various philosophical teachings, myths, history that is closely related to wild life. So, apart from providing animal tourism, BSMP has a strong educational and cultural vision. There, visitors can feel comfortable giving food to animals, having direct contact with trained animals, and watching animal shows (animals education and conservation shows).

Animals
In early November 2012, BSMP received the transfer of 72 crocodiles from the Reptile Park, Mengwi, Badung, Bali because the Reptile Park did not have a permit and treated 72 crocodiles (children, adults, even eggs) so that the crocodiles could get a proper place and care.

Animal list
 Nilgai
 Lion
 Bengal tiger
 Sumatran tiger
 Sumatran elephant
 Bull
 Hyenas
 zebras
 Giraffe
 Oryx
 Gaur
 Orangutan
 Siamang
 Hog deer
 Indian antelope
 Thompson's gazelles
 Grinning Crocodile
 estuarine crocodile
 White rhino

Facilities

Bali Safari and Marine Park has many facilities, including:
 Animals in natural surroundings
 Recreation area
 Waterpark
 Fun Zone
 Cottages and bungalows
 Restaurants

The zoo provides bus tours for visitors to view some 1000 animals from 3 regions including Indonesia, India, and Africa.

Ganesha Park
Ganesha Park is a park which has a  statue of Ganesha. This will be the entrance to the Bali Theatre, which will feature Balinese Art. Foreign tourist can enjoy elephants bathing on this place

Pura Safari
Pura Safari is a temple (pura) located in the zoo, where people of Hindu Dharma and Hindu religious worship.

Price and facilities
In 2023, the domestic ticket price for the cheapest package, the Safari Explorer, is Rp. 175,000 per adult and Rp. 135,000 per child (3-12 years). The price includes Education and Conservation Programs such as various Animal Presentations, Safari Journey, Fun Zone and Water Play Zone, Feed the Predator, Jeep 4x4, Bali Teatre, Uma and Tsavo Lion Restaurant, Night Safari. In addition to the facilities listed above, Bali Safari park has a hotel in the park, namely the Mara River Safari Lodge, with the theme African hotel in Bali.

Awards
Due to the seriousness of the management and government in Bali, Bali Safari & Marine Park has received awards several times, including Indonesia Leading Theme Park from the 2012/2013 and 2013 Indonesia Travel and Tourism Awards (ITTA) and the 2015 Cipta Award for the category of Artificial Tourism Attraction Management. National Level Environmental Insight from the Ministry of Tourism and Creative Economy. Bali Safari also received Best Tourist Attraction from Best of Bali Awards 2012 and Certificate of Excellence 2013 from TripAdvisor. This award is the pride of a conservation park on the Island of the Gods which was founded in 2007.

Photo gallery

References

Animal theme parks
Zoos in Indonesia
Tourist attractions in Bali
2007 establishments in Indonesia
Buildings and structures in Bali
Zoos established in 2007